Reina Roffé (born 4 November 1951) is an Argentine writer. She was born in Buenos Aires. She studied journalism and literature at university. Her first novel, Llamado al Puf, won the Premio Pondal Ríos for the best work by a young author in 1973. For La rompiente, she received the Premio Internacional de Novela Breve awarded by the Municipality of San Francisco, Córdoba.

In addition to her work as a writer and teacher, she has written for numerous papers and journals in Argentina (Clarín, La Razón, La Opinión, Tiempo Argentino, Página 12, Latinoamericana, Siete Días, Crisis, Fin de Siglo), the United States (Chicago Sun Times), and Spain (Cambio 16, Marie Claire, Guía del Niño, Quimera, Clarín, Revista de Nueva Literatura, Televisión Educativa Iberoamericana).

Her stories have appeared in many publications and anthologies in Europe and America. Since 1988, she has lived in Madrid.

Selected works
 Llamado al Puf (1973) novela, Pleamar, Buenos Aires.
 Juan Rulfo: autobiografía armada (1973), ensayo, Corregidor, Buenos Aires. Reeditado por Editorial Montesinos, Barcelona, en 1992.
 Monte de Venus (1976) novela, Corregidor, Buenos Aires.
 Espejo de escritores (entrevistas) (1984) Ediciones del Norte, New Hampshire.
 La rompiente (1987) novela, Puntosur, Buenos Aires, y Editorial Universitaria de Veracruz.
 El cielo dividido (1996) novela, Sudamericana, Buenos Aires.

References

1951 births
Living people
Argentine women novelists
20th-century Argentine writers
People from Buenos Aires
International Writing Program alumni